Žminj is a small town in Istria, Croatia, 15 km south of Pazin. It has a population of 3,483, and was first mentioned in 1177 as a parish of the Poreč diocese.

The town is located on a limestone hill between the Lim valley and the Raša valley, 355 meters above sea level. Its economy is based on farming and livestock breeding. Žminj is located at the intersection of regional roads to Pazin, Kanfanar, Svetvinčenat and Labin. This part of Istria has a number of tourist attractions, landscapes and the remnants of cultural heritage from all ages (such as a tower Citadel in the old town).

Exquisite specialities of Istrian cuisine: "maneštra" (minestra), sausages with cabbage, venison with "fuži" (a kind of pasta), "supa" (crisp bread in red wine, with olive-oil and pepper) and the famous wines, teran and malmsey.

Žminj and its surroundings are used hiking and cycling tours, as well as for agritourism, which developed in many of the surrounding villages. Žminj is the traditional host of the Bartulja festival. Held at the end of August, this festival is dedicated to St. Bartholomew, patron of Žminj (in the church of St. Bartholomew).

Other traditional events are the Chakavian Assembly, a contest of young poets and reciters of poetry in the Chakavian dialect (in June) and the Harmonica Wedding, a competition in accordion-playing (in July).

Žminj is also known for its agricultural fair which takes place every second Wednesday in the month.

Notable people
 Gabrijela Galant Jelenić, musician, grew up in Žminj.

References

External links

 

Municipalities of Croatia
Populated places in Istria County